Staley School of the Spoken Word also known as "Staley School of Oratory", "Staley School", or "Staley College", was a college in Brookline, Massachusetts, founded by Dr. Delbert Moyer Staley, that closed in 1957. Originally named College of the Spoken Word, it opened in 1905 on Huntington Avenue in Boston; by 1920, the school had relocated to Brookline and was located at Washington Street and Cypress Street. As of 1992, their charter was held by Boston College.

Many aspiring leaders and politicians came to the school, largely to polish their presence and presentation.  The majority had already earned college degrees, some from institutions such as Harvard University. One famous Harvard alumnus to be graduated from Staley was future president John F. Kennedy.

Notable alumni
Edward C. Carroll, Member of the Massachusetts Senate from 1933 to 1938.
James Michael Curley, Mayor of Boston, Governor of Massachusetts, Member of the United States House of Representatives
George Demeter, member of the Massachusetts House of Representatives, law professor, and author of Demeter's Manual of Parliamentary Law and Procedure
Joseph P. Kennedy Jr., United States Navy officer, older brother of John F. Kennedy, killed during World War II
John F. Kennedy, 35th President of the United States
Paul Pender, boxer
David J. O'Connor, member of the Massachusetts House of Representatives from 1951 to 1970
Dapper O'Neil, member of the Boston City Council from 1971 to 1999
Maurice J. Tobin, Governor of Massachusetts, U.S. Secretary of Labor, Mayor of Boston
Thomas J. Spring, Massachusetts judge
Thomas McAuliffe

References 

1905 establishments in Massachusetts
1957 disestablishments in Massachusetts
Boston College
Buildings and structures in Brookline, Massachusetts
Defunct private universities and colleges in Massachusetts
Educational institutions disestablished in 1957
Educational institutions established in 1905
Universities and colleges in Norfolk County, Massachusetts